Kallakkottai is a village in the Gandaravakottai revenue block of Pudukkottai district, Tamil Nadu, India.

Demographics 
As per the 2001 census, Kallakottai had a total population of 3894 with 1976 males and 2008 females. Out of the total population 1968 people were literate.

References

Villages in Pudukkottai district